Borderline Records was formed in 1989 by an underground artist named Bryant Clover.

History

The label was founded in 1989 by Bryant Clover. Clover was signed to the Atlantic Records roster but was released before releasing am album. He then started his label, now known as, "Borderline". Throughout the years, the label has had over 60 artists signed to it. From 1992 to 1995 the label had distributing rights with Atlantic. Atlantic ended distribution in 1996 due to poor record sales. In 1997 the label signed their largest artist Rodney, an r&b singer. He sold over 55,000 albums. In 2002 the label also signed a prominent artist, Wallstreet, who sold over 40,000 copies. In late 2003 the label went bankrupt before a revival two years later. The label has celebrated selling over 400,000 copies during its existence as a recording label, 170,000 of them since the label's return in 2005. 

The label's top three selling artists are Wallstreet with 110,000, Rodney with 80,000 and Hood Mob with 65,000 albums sold.

Artist

Rodney - Rodney Jenkins - Atlanta, Georgia
Birdie - Bird Williams - Decatur, Georgia
Blockhead - Jamal Burgess - Birmingham, Alabama
Peedy - Percy Jones - Durham, North Carolina
Motive - Brian Farret - Long Island, New York
Mercy - Marcey Levens - Philadelphia, Pennsylvania
Roger - Roger Burts - Jackson, Mississippi

See also
 List of record labels

American record labels
Vanity record labels
Record labels established in 1989